The 2020 Marshall Thundering Herd men's soccer team represented Marshall University during the 2020 NCAA Division I men's soccer season. It was the 42nd season of the university fielding a men's varsity soccer program. The Thundering Herd, led by fourth-year head coach Chris Grassie, played their home games at Veterans Memorial Soccer Complex as members of Conference USA (C-USA).

The 2020 NCAA season was impacted by the ongoing COVID-19 pandemic., with Conference USA announcing the move of the men's soccer season from the fall to the following spring. Marshall finished the season as the regular season champions defeating Charlotte, 2–0, in the regular season finale to claim their back-to-back title.

Marshall would qualify for the 2020 NCAA Division I Men's Soccer Tournament with the automatic bid from Conference USA.  Marshall would defeat undefeated Fordham, #1 seeded Clemson, defending national champion Georgetown, and College Cup hosts UNC on the way to the national championship game.  In the College Cup Finals, Marshall defeated Indiana, 1-0, scoring on a Jamil Roberts overtime goal to claim the program's first NCAA Men's Soccer National Championship, as well as the first national team championship in any sport won by a C-USA member while affiliated with the league.

Roster 
Updated April 18, 2021

Schedule 

Source:

|-
!colspan=6 style=""| Regular season

|-
!colspan=6 style=""| NCAA Tournament
|-

|-

Rankings

References 

2020
Marshall Thundering Herd
Marshall Thundering Herd
Marshall Thundering Herd men's soccer
Marsh
NCAA Division I Men's Soccer Tournament College Cup seasons
2020 Marshall Thundering Herd